Yōsuke Takahashi (高橋 洋丞, born 6 August 1991 in Saitama Prefecture, Japan) is a Japanese rugby union player, currently playing with  Top League side Toyota Verblitz. He usually plays as a tighthead prop.

Rugby career

Toyota Verblitz

After representing Toyota Verblitz at Under-19 and Under-20 level, he joined the senior team for the 2014–15 Top League season. He played in all seven of their matches during the first stage as they finished in fourth spot to qualify to Group 1 of the second stage. He made six appearances in their seven matches in this stage, as they won two and lost five matches to finish in six position, qualifying for the wildcard play-offs. He featured in their match at that stage, but a 27–36 defeat to the NTT DoCoMo Red Hurricanes saw them fail to advance to the 52nd All Japan Rugby Football Championship.

In 2015–16, he played in all three of their pre-season pool matches, and in both matches in the top bracket play-offs to help Toyota Verblitz secure third position in the pre-season tournament. He played in all seven of their matches during the regular season as they won five of their matches to finish in third spot to qualify for the title play-offs. They lost to Toshiba Brave Lupus in the Quarter Finals, but beat NTT Communications Shining Arcs and Canon Eagles to finish the competition in fifth spot.

Free State Cheetahs

In March 2016, the Toyota-sponsored South African Currie Cup side the  announced that Takahasi and winger Yoshizumi Takeda joined them on a short-term deal for the 2016 Currie Cup qualification series, as part of a player exchange programme between the two teams due to their connection with Toyota.

Representative rugby

Takahashi represented the Japan Under-20 side at the 2011 IRB Junior World Rugby Trophy, making an appearance in their first match against Zimbabwe Under-20.

References

Japanese rugby union players
Living people
1991 births
Sportspeople from Saitama Prefecture
Rugby union props
Toyota Verblitz players
Free State Cheetahs players
Japanese expatriate rugby union players
Expatriate rugby union players in South Africa